Lotus Vodka is a brand of vodka.  It is distilled in the United States from wheat, then shipped to San Francisco to be bottled by Delicious Brands.  It was first released on premises in San Francisco, CA in 2007.  Lotus Vodka donates a portion of its profits to charity.

Variants
Lotus Vodka is currently available in two variants:
 White Lotus - A "vitamin vodka" with added vitamin B3, vitamin B5, vitamin B6, vitamin B12, vitamin C, and others
 Blue Lotus - An "energy vodka" with added caffeine, taurine, guarana, and flavorings (a vodka energy drink)

Notes

External links
Lotus Vodka - Official Site
Vodka with a conscience - S.F. Business Times
Lotus Vodka Offers Release - Valleywag
Lotus Vodka - Yelp
Lotus Vodka - Chow Magazine

American vodkas
Food and drink in the San Francisco Bay Area